Catherine Kamowski (born 8 April 1958) is a French politician of La République En Marche! (LREM) who was elected to the French National Assembly on 18 June 2017, representing the department of Isère.

Political career
In parliament, Kamowski serves on the Committee on Legal Affairs.

In addition to her committee assignments, Kamowski is a member of the French-Quebec Parliamentary Friendship Group. She has also been a substitute member of the French delegation to the Parliamentary Assembly of the Council of Europe (PACE) since 2019.

Political positions
In 2018, Kamowski joined other co-signatories around Sébastien Nadot in officially filing a request for a commission of inquiry into the legality of French weapons sales to the Saudi-led coalition fighting in Yemen, days before an official visit of Saudi Crown Prince Mohammed bin Salman to Paris.

In July 2019, Kamowski voted in favour of the French ratification of the European Union’s Comprehensive Economic and Trade Agreement (CETA) with Canada.

References

1958 births
Living people
Deputies of the 15th National Assembly of the French Fifth Republic
Women members of the National Assembly (France)
La République En Marche! politicians
21st-century French women politicians
People from Valenciennes
French people of Polish descent
Politicians from Hauts-de-France